The 2008–09 SIJHL season is the 8th season of the Superior International Junior Hockey League (SIJHL). The six teams of the SIJHL will play 50-game schedules.

Come February, the top teams of the league will play down for the Bill Salonen Cup, the SIJHL championship.  The winner of the Bill Salonen Cup will compete in the Central Canadian Junior "A" championship, the Dudley Hewitt Cup.  If successful against the winners of the Ontario Junior Hockey League and Northern Ontario Junior Hockey League, the champion would then move on to play in the Canadian Junior Hockey League championship, the 2009 Royal Bank Cup.

Changes 
Sioux Lookout Flyers join league.
Thunder Bay Bulldogs merge into Thunder Bay Bearcats.

Final standings
Note: GP = Games played; W = Wins; L = Losses; OTL = Overtime losses; SL = Shootout losses; GF = Goals for; GA = Goals against; PTS = Points; x = clinched playoff berth; y = clinched division title; z = clinched conference title

Teams listed on the official league website.

Standings listed on official league website.

2008-09 Bill Salonen Cup Playoffs

Playoff results are listed on the official league website.

Dudley Hewitt Cup Championship
Hosted by the Schreiber Diesels in Schreiber, Ontario.  Fort William finished in second place and Schreiber finished in third.

Round Robin
Fort William North Stars 2 - Soo Thunderbirds (NOJHL) 0
Kingston Voyageurs (OJHL) 9 - Schreiber Diesels 0
Fort William North Stars 1 - Kingston Voyageurs (OJHL) 0
Schreiber Diesels 2 - Soo Thunderbirds (NOJHL) 0
Schreiber Diesels 5 - Fort William North Stars 2

Semi-final
Fort William North Stars 4 - Schreiber Diesels 3

Final
Kingston Voyageurs (OJHL) 4 - Fort William North Stars 1

Scoring leaders 
Note: GP = Games played; G = Goals; A = Assists; Pts = Points; PIM = Penalty minutes

Leading goaltenders 
Note: GP = Games played; Mins = Minutes played; W = Wins; L = Losses: OTL = Overtime losses; SL = Shootout losses; GA = Goals Allowed; SO = Shutouts; GAA = Goals against average

Awards
Most Valuable Player - Trevor Gamache (Fort William North Stars)
Most Improved Player - Kevin Burton (Dryden Ice Dogs)
Rookie of the Year - Jay Pelletier (Fort William North Stars)
Top Defenceman - Brad Pawlowski (Thunder Bay Bearcats)
Top Defensive Forward - Cayle Brown (Fort William North Stars)
and Mitch Cain (Fort Frances Jr. Sabres)
Most Gentlemanly Player - Joel Langevin (Fort William North Stars)
Top Goaltender - Ryan Faragher (Fort Frances Jr. Sabres)
Coach of the Year - Todd Howarth (Fort William North Stars)
Top Scorer Award - Trevor Gamache (Fort William North Stars)
Top Executive - Doug Lawrance (Sioux Lookout Flyers)

See also 
 2009 Royal Bank Cup
 Dudley Hewitt Cup

References

External links 
 Official website of the Superior International Junior Hockey League
 Official website of the Canadian Junior Hockey League

Superior International Junior Hockey League seasons
SIJHL